Loane is a surname. Notable people with the surname include:

Roland Warpole Loane (died 1844), Anglo-Irish merchant who settled in New South Wales
Alice Loane (1863–1922), British author
George Green Loane (1865–1945), Anglo-Irish classical scholar and schoolmaster
Marcus Loane (1912–2009), Australian Anglican bishop
Bob Loane (1914–2002), American Baseball player
Mark Loane (born 1954), Australian rugby football player
Tim Loane (fl. 2000s), Northern Irish writer, director, and actor

See also
Loane (born 1978), a French singer-songwriter